Wilhelm Zander (22 April 1911 – 27 September 1974) was an adjutant to Martin Bormann during World War II. He died in Munich in 1974.

Biography
He was born in Saarbrücken. Although he received only minimal education, Zander built up business interests in Italy. He abandoned these interests to take up a full-time post as a Nazi Party worker. In 1933, he joined the Schutzstaffel (SS) and later achieved the rank of SS-Standartenführer.

In early 1945, he accompanied Bormann and German leader Adolf Hitler to the Führerbunker in Berlin. On 29 April 1945, during the Battle of Berlin, Hitler dictated his last will and political testament. Three messengers were assigned to take the will and political testament out of the besieged city of Berlin to ensure their presence for posterity. The first messenger was deputy press attaché, Heinz Lorenz. The second messenger was Willy Johannmeyer, Hitler's army adjutant, and third was Zander. The three men left that day. Bormann had instructed Zander to carry the documents to Karl Doenitz.

By 30 April, with the Soviet Red Army less than 500 metres from the bunker complex, Hitler committed suicide. Zander made it through the Soviet Army encirclement of Berlin to the west.

After the war ended, it was subsequently discovered that he had adopted the surname Paustin and worked as a gardener. He was captured under this name in the American occupation zone and as a consequence the copies of Hitler's will and testament fell into the hands of the American and British forces. Thereafter, by January 1946, the texts of the documents were published in the American and British press.

References 

1911 births
1974 deaths
SS-Standartenführer
Military personnel from Munich
People from the Kingdom of Bavaria
Martin Bormann